Carrfour Supportive Housing is a nonprofit organization established in 1993 by the Homeless Committee of the Greater Miami Chamber of Commerce. It develops, operates and manages affordable and supportive housing communities for low-income individuals and families in Miami-Dade County, Florida. Carrfour is Florida's largest not-for-profit supportive housing provider, housing more than 10,000 formerly homeless men, women and children in 20 communities throughout Miami-Dade County, assembling over $300 million of financing, tax credits and subsidies, and developing more than 1,700 affordable housing units since its founding.

History

In the early 1990s, as the homeless population of Miami-Dade county grew to more than 8,000 people, the Greater Miami Chamber of Commerce formed a Homeless Committee to find a permanent solution to homelessness. These efforts led the Chamber to establish Carrfour Supportive Housing as a nonprofit entity "whose mission was to provide both permanent housing and supportive services to help the formerly homeless successfully reintegrate into society by helping them achieve their full potential."

National recognition

In February 2009, Time magazine featured Carrfour in a national science story: The following year, in April 2010, former President Bill Clinton hosted a Clinton Global Initiative day of service at Verde Gardens, which includes a 22-acre organic farm. The community was built on the site of the former Homestead Airforce Base.

A September 2012 national wire story featured the Carrfour community as a new model for tackling homelessness.

Also in September 2012, The Huffington Post featured Verde Gardens in a story that highlighted Miami-Dade County's success reducing homelessness by well over 50%.

In May 2013, Carrfour's Verde Gardens community won the National Development Council's 2013 Academy Award for Housing Development.

Shortly after his confirmation as the 17th United States Secretary of Housing and Urban Development, Dr. Ben Carson visited Carrfour's Villa Aurora community in Miami, seeking to better understand the role federal funding played in providing subsidized housing for very low-income families.

Carrfour Supportive Housing impacted reducing homelessness.

Subprime mortgage crisis

When the subprime mortgage crisis hit, Carrfour, like other developers dependent on tax credits to finance construction, faced some of the most difficult challenges in its history

Doug Mayer, VP for housing development at the nonprofit Carrfour Supportive Housing, said its Dr. Barbara Carey-Shuler Manor rental project was delayed by a year because it could not secure the low income tax credits that it had qualified for. This form of financing comes from profitable companies – usually financial firms – that give cash to affordable housing projects in exchange for writing off taxes. The low-income tax credit market evaporated when the financial crisis hit last fall. "Hundreds of projects across the country stalled because they couldn't find a market for the tax credits," Mayer said.Funding through the American Recovery and Reinvestment Act of 2009 enabled Carrfour to successfully navigate the financial crisis and experience the most rapid growth in the organization's history.

The city of Miami has partnered with local nonprofits to renovate 26, one-bedroom apartments in Overtown. The project will be funded with $2.5 million in federal neighborhood stabilization dollars ... The nonprofit consortium includes the Neighborhood Housing Services of South Florida, Carrfour Supportive Housing, the Little Haiti Housing Association, Opa Locka Community Development Corp., and the Urban League of Greater Miami.

As demand for affordable housing and construction jobs rises, Carrfour Supportive Housing is putting federal stimulus dollars to work by purchasing a distressed apartment complex in North Miami Beach with plans to renovate and deliver 56 low-cost units in 2012 ... All told, Miami-based Carrfour was granted $17 million of the $89 million that has been directed to Miami-Dade County through the NSP2 program.

Southern Miami-Dade County will feature a new apartment complex by Carrfour Supportive Housing in December. The company will open a mid-rise, six-story, 80-apartment building at the corner of Southwest 260th St. and South Dixie Highway in Naranja. The apartment, called Casa Matias, will provide housing for homeless families and low-income families.

A distressed 1950s multifamily building is getting demolished so the site on which it sits can serve as an affordable housing complex. The $20 million development of Hampton Village Apartments will offer four-stories of multifamily housing  units and services to help people better their lives. HUD's NSP2 initiative, part of the American Recovery and Reinvestment Act of 2009, has granted nearly $2 billion to states, local governments, nonprofits and public and or private nonprofit entities on a competitive basis, with the purpose of rehabilitating distressed properties. Carrfour Supportive Housing was part of a consortium of Miami-Dade County development firms that were granted $89 million in funding through the program.

Coalition Lift

In June 2016, Carrfour launched Coalition Lift, a $6.5 million Miami-Dade County, Florida project to "house 34 chronically homeless men and women, while also conducting research to prove that doing so is far less expensive than leaving them on the streets." The initiative includes collaboration with the University of South Florida researchers to compare the cost of providing publicly funded housing and supportive services versus the overall taxpayer cost of services for a "control group with similar demographic characteristics who choose not to be housed."

Carrfour's CEO estimated "it costs about $6,000 a year to house someone in a supportive facility" versus $30,000-$50,000 annually for emergency services to meet the needs of a chronically homeless person without housing.

The Residences at Equality Park

In August 2016, Carrfour secured financing to develop, build and operate South Florida's first supportive housing community that will significantly serve gay, lesbian, bisexual and transgender seniors. The "Residences at Equality Park" is Carrfour's first development outside of Miami-Dade County. Carrfour's competitive application for tax credits won funding from Florida Housing Finance Corporation for "housing credit and gap financing for affordable housing developments for persons with a disabling condition", providing the financing needed to begin construction of The Residences at Equality Park as an initial 48-unit apartment complex at North Dixie Highway and Northeast 20th Drive in Wilton Manors, Florida.

The effort to create affordable, supportive housing in Wilton Manors began in 2012 when City Commissioner Tom Green proposed development of affordable housing for the community's primarily LGBT seniors. Three years later, the proposal won unanimous support from the City Commission to create "12,346 square feet of retail space and 130 affordable housing units" within The Pride Center at Equality Park's five-acre campus. Pride Center Florida formally partnered with Carrfour to pursue funding, develop and operate the housing complex.

References

External links

PBS, "Home at Last?", NOW series program, first aired on February 2, 2007. The topic was what will most help homeless people reenter the fabric of society.

Homelessness, Current information on U.S. homelessness written by The Rev. Chuck Currie, former National Coalition for the Homeless board member.
 "Grand Opening of Amistad Apartments" YouTube link to Miami Mayor Tomás Pedro Regalado speaking at Amistad grand opening.
 "Low Income Families Move Into Little Havana Apartments" Link to NBC 6 Miami news report.

Charities based in Florida
Homelessness in the United States
Housing organizations in the United States
Organizations established in 1993
Miami-Dade County, Florida
1993 establishments in Florida
Housing in Florida